Cungrea is a commune in Olt County, Muntenia, Romania. It is composed of seven villages: Cepești, Cungrea, Ibănești, Miești, Oteștii de Jos, Oteștii de Sus and Spătaru.

References

Communes in Olt County
Localities in Muntenia